Cornero is a surname. Notable people with the surname include:

Anthony Cornero (1899–1955), Italian-born American bootlegger and gambling entrepreneur
Lola Cornero (1892–1980), Dutch film actress
Miguel Ángel Cornero (1952–1999), Argentine footballer